Przemysław Trytko (born 28 August 1987) is a Polish professional footballer who plays as a forward for IV liga club Piast Strzelce Opolskie.

Career

Club
Trytko was born in Opole. After spending three years with Gwarek Zabrze, he joined German club FC Energie Cottbus in 2006 at the age of 19. Two years later, he joined Ekstraklasa side Arka Gdynia on a two-year loan. In the summer of 2010 he signed a three-year contract with Jagiellonia Białystok.

In February 2011, he was loaned to Polonia Bytom on a half-year deal.

On 8 August 2012, Trytko joined German Regionalliga Nordost side FC Carl Zeiss Jena on a season-long loan deal, which was made permanent in January 2013. He returned to Poland in July 2013 to sign for Korona Kielce.

In February 2016, Trytko signed for Kazakhstan Premier League side FC Atyrau.

Honours
Jagiellonia Białystok
 Polish Super Cup: 2010

Arka Gdynia
 Polish Cup: 2016–17

References

External links
 
 

Living people
1987 births
Sportspeople from Opole
Association football midfielders
Association football forwards
Polish footballers
Polish expatriate footballers
FC Energie Cottbus players
FC Energie Cottbus II players
Arka Gdynia players
Polonia Bytom players
FC Carl Zeiss Jena players
Korona Kielce players
FC Atyrau players
Chrobry Głogów players
Bałtyk Gdynia players
Gryf Wejherowo players
LKS Goczałkowice-Zdrój players
Ekstraklasa players
I liga players
II liga players
III liga players
Regionalliga players
Bundesliga players
Kazakhstan Premier League players
Expatriate footballers in Germany
Expatriate footballers in Kazakhstan
Polish expatriate sportspeople in Germany